D'Amico–UM Tools is an Italian UCI Continental team founded in 2014, that participates in UCI Continental Circuits races.

Team roster

Major wins
2014
Grand Prix Südkärnten, Andrea Pasqualon
Stage 7 Vuelta a Colombia, Andrea Pasqualon
2015
 Under-23 Road Race Championships, Iltjan Nika
 Under-23 Time Trial Championships, Iltjan Nika
2016
Ronde de l'Oise, Antonio Parrinello
Coupe des Carpathes, Antonio Parrinello

National champions
2015
 Under-23 Road Race, Iltjan Nika
 Under-23 Time Trial, Iltjan Nika

References

External links

UCI Continental Teams (Europe)
Cycling teams based in Italy
Cycling teams established in 2014
2014 establishments in Italy